Kovoor Iype Thoma Kathanar (1842–1917) (Malayalam: കോവൂർ ഐപ്പ് തോമാ കത്തനാർ), popularly known as Kovoor Achen,  was a renowned and pioneering clergyman of the Mar Thoma Syrian Church. 
Together with Mathews Mar Athanasius Metropolitan, he led the reformation activities in the Malankara Church after the passing away of Abraham Malpan including the establishment of prayer meetings, vernacular worship and Holy Communion in Malayalam as well as the publication of translated and revised Syriac Liturgy in Malayalam, all of which led to the eventual formation of the Mar Thoma Church.
He also played an important role during the first three decades of the church's independent existence as its first Vicar General, after it separated from the Malankara Jacobite Syrian Church following the Travancore Royal Court verdict in 1889.

Life and Education 
Iype Thoma Kathanar was born on 2 December 1842 (17 Vrichikam 1017, M.E.) as Iype Thommy into the aristocratic Kovoor family of Syrian Christians at Thiruvalla, Travancore state.
He was born to his father Kovoor Thommy Iype who was a timber merchant and his mother Mariamma who was the daughter of Ittycheria Punoose of the Pulimoottil family in Thiruvalla. He had one sister (Mariamma) and four brothers (Behannan, Punoose, Eliyas, and Cherian). As a child, he was popularly known as Thommy.

As was the norm during those days, he received primary education from the local Kudippallikoodam under the guidance of Thiruvalla Palliyil Ashan. Later on, he studied basic English, Mathematics and Bible study (Christian) at the Church Missionary School at Thukalassery (Thiruvalla). The school recommended him higher education at England, but this proposal was rejected by his parents.
 
Later on, he studied Syriac language, liturgy and chants from his relative and Syriac scholar, Kovoor Gheevarhese Kathanar. He became highly proficient in Syriac liturgy at the age of 16 and used to sing and chant liturgical prayers and hymns in Syriac at Niranam church, and he could impress Mathews Mar Athanasius Metropolitan during one of his visits to Niranam.

Ordination
In 1858, Iype Thommy received holy ordination as a deacon, from Mathews Mar Athanasius Metropolitan at Kottayam Old Seminary.
In 1859, he married Elizhuba who belonged to the famous Kallooppara Maret family.
In 1861, Iype Thomy received holy ordination as a priest, from Euyakim Mar Coorilos the Patriarchal delegate Metropolitan sent from Antioch, at his home parish, the Thiruvalla Paliyakara St. George Church. Thus, he started his pastoral ministry and became known as Kovoor Achen.

Reformation in Malankara Church
Inspired by the ministry and reformatory teachings of early reformers such as Abraham Malpan and Kaithayil Geevarghese Malpan, Kovoor Achen introduced some bold reformatory steps at the Paliyakara Church. This included the use of Malayalam language for Holy Communion instead of Syriac alone that was not understood by the congregation. However, this was not acceptable to the congregation (including his father and family members) who, except for a handful of visionary people, largely opposed Achen's actions and lodged a complaint to the Metropolitan in 1869.

However, the Metropolitan did not take any disciplinary action and offered a solution that a wall be built at the east side of the church so that Achen can conduct the qurbana there. Nevertheless, Kovoor Achen continued to use the main altar of the church and went on with his reformatory steps. This led to larger protests, assaults and fictitious allegations to government and eventually the opposing faction constructing a new church at Kavumbhagam (on a land provided by Kattapuram family), namely the Kattapuram St. George Church and later one more new church nearby that was called St. Mulk Church, Kavumbhagam.

In spite of opposition, Kovoor Achen carried on with reformation activities. He introduced prayer groups and prayer meetings in Malayalam, wherein lay people were allowed to pray and organize prayer meetings to ensure day to day spiritual upbringing of the church members.

He also oversaw the construction of the wooden bridge in front of the Paliyakara church. Under his supervision, a formal accounting system with book keeping was established to manage the church finances in a proper manner.

The liturgical reformation undertaken by him led to the first formal Malayalam translation of the Thaksa i.e. the West Syriac Jacobite version of St. James Liturgy, with necessary corrections, deletions and revisions made as per the basic principles of reformation in Malankara that were established a few decades ago by Abraham Malpan. In 1872, after getting approval from Mathews Mar Athanasius Metropolitan, this revised Liturgy was formally published in Malayalam and printed at CMS Press, Kottayam. This revised translated Liturgy was followed in eight churches including Maramon Church.

The reformatory activities eventually led to the Royal Travancore Court Verdict of 1889 and eventual formation of the Mar Thoma Church as an independent church, but without access to any of the old churches except for 3 of them.

Leadership in the Mar Thoma Church
In 1892, Kovoor Achen was designed as the Vicar General of the Mar Thoma Church.
In the same year, he realized the purchase of Panchayathu Purayidam (present day S.C.S. Thiruvalla campus on S.C.S. Mount) to establish a permanent central campus for the Church. This Panchathu property was purchased from Thittapallil, a rich Ezhava family of Thiruvalla, for a sum of Rs.600.
This sum was raised from a generous endowment made from Puthencavu Mathilakam Arohanam Mar Thoma Church out of the Rs. 1000 that they had received as severance pay in lieu of relinquishing their claims upon separating from their pre-reformation home parish St. Mary's Orthodox Cathedral, Puthencavu in 1900.

Kovoor Achen is also credited with the practice of Kettuthengu (Malayalam: കെട്ടുതെങ്ങ്), wherein coconut trees from each home is dedicated to generate funds that help meet the expenses of the Church activities, since coconuts and coconut tree products were a main source of income for most families during those times.

He also oversaw the consecration of several priests and bishops who led the church during the 19th and 20th Century. A notable example being Abraham Mar Thoma who was sent to USA as a Deacon in 1912 for his doctoral studies until 1915 on Kovoor Achen's initiative. This was before Abraham Mar Thoma was consecrated as a priest and later as Bishop on 28 December 1917 (although Kovoor Achen could not witness the consecration as Bishop, as he passed away during January 1917).

When Ipe Thoma Kathanaar became the Vicar General, his nephew K.P. Thomas was consecrated as a priest by Titus I Metropolitan in 1895 at Paliekkara Church. 
Rev. K. P. Thomas taught at Kottayam Mar Thoma Seminary and also acted as Assistant Vicar to Ipe Thoma Kathanar and served at various parishes such as Thiruvalla, Mepral, Chatthenkery and Karackal.

In secular life
Ipe Thoma Kathanar was well known as an orator and debater. One of his famous debates at Niranam was documented.

As a representative of the people of Thiruvalla taluk, he was elected to the Travancore Sri Mulam Praja Sabha, the first popularly elected legislature in modern India, during the years 1904, 1905, 1911, 1914 and 1915.

Death

On 16 January 1917, Kovoor Achen became sick and he died peacefully on 27 January 1917.
Achen’s body was buried in the SCS compound behind the SCS Church.

Legacy
In his memory, the church constructed the VGM Hall (Vicar General Iype Thoma Kathanar Memorial Hall) in the SCS compound in Tiruvalla, that still stands today as an important go-to place in Thiruvalla town for conducting large meetings, conferences and major events.

His son Abraham Thomas Kovoor (1898 – 1978) was a professor and rationalist who became famous through his campaign to expose various Indian and Sri Lankan "god-men" and so-called paranormal phenomena as frauds.
His grand son, Aries Kovoor (1927 - 2006), was also a professor and renowned biological scientist of Sri Lanka.

His younger son, Kovoor Thomas Behanan was a renowned sociologist and psychologist, who earned Ph.D. in Psychology from Yale in 1934 and had performed pioneering scientific appraisal on Yoga that was published as a book and made popular to the western world through visual coverage in the LIFE magazine in 1937.
Behanan had also served the United Nations between 1946 and 1952.

References

1842 births
1917 deaths
Mar Thoma Syrian Church
Christian clergy from Kerala